George Myers ( – 17 February 2023) was a Bahamian hotelier and businessman.

Background
Myers was born in Jamaica, where his family was in the hotel business. As a child, he worked in family-owned Miranda Lodge in Montego Bay. He worked in London as a management trainee at the Westbury Hotel before moving to the Bahamas in 1963.

Career
Myers was a businessman in the Bahamas. He was credited with playing a major part in the development of Paradise Island into a premier tourist destination in the Bahamas.

Myers was chair and CEO of the Myers Group which was created in 1992.  The Myers Group owns the Bahamian franchises for Burger King, Dunkin' Donuts, Kentucky Fried Chicken (KFC), and Quiznos Subs. The group previously operated the Radisson Cable Beach Hotel.

Myers was executive vice president of Resorts International from 1977 to 1992. Myers served in the past as president of the Bahamas Hotel Employers Association, the Bahamas Hotel Association, and the Caribbean Hotel Association.

Death
Myers died on 17 February 2023, at the age of 83.

Awards
In 1998, Myers was given the government's Silver Jubilee Award in recognition of "outstanding contribution to national development, in particular, in tourism".

In 2006, Myers was awarded the Sir Clement Maynard Lifetime Achievement Award at the Cacique Awards.

In 2009, he was awarded the Bahamian Chamber of Commerce's Achievement Award.

References

External links
Myers parachutes new franchise into airport, Nassau Guardian
 Myers-operated Radisson 'insolvent', Nassau Guardian
Investors express interest in Grand Bahama, Nassau Guardian

Year of birth uncertain
1930s births
2023 deaths
Bahamian businesspeople
Hoteliers
Jamaican emigrants to the Bahamas